Joseph Pierre Jean-Claude "Tod" Campeau (June 4, 1923 — December 31, 2009) was a Canadian ice hockey forward who played 42 games in the National Hockey League for the Montreal Canadiens between 1943 and 1949. The rest of his career, which lasted from 1943 to 1957, was spent in the minor leagues. He was born in Saint-Jérôme, Quebec and died in Salaberry-de-Valleyfield, Quebec.

Career statistics

Regular season and playoffs

External links
 

1923 births
2009 deaths
Buffalo Bisons (AHL) players
Canadian ice hockey forwards
Chicoutimi Saguenéens (QSHL) players
Cincinnati Mohawks (AHL) players
Dallas Texans (USHL) players
Ice hockey people from Quebec
Montreal Canadiens players
Montreal Royals (QSHL) players
Ottawa Senators (QSHL) players
People from Saint-Jérôme
Pittsburgh Hornets players
Providence Reds players
Sherbrooke Saints players
Valleyfield Braves players